Basilica San Paolo is a station on the Line B of the Rome Metro. It was opened in 1955 and is located at the intersection between Viale Giustiniano Imperatore and Via Gaspare Gozzi, behind the Basilica of Saint Paul Outside the Walls (after which it is named) in the Ostiense quarter. It is also one of three Metro stations also served by the Rome-Lido railway line.

Before reaching the station the line, in the Porta San Paolo direction, runs through a 230m gorge excavated in the 1920s from the "Roccia di San Paolo" to avoid interfering with the landscape, rather than the original plan which ran the line around the "roccia" but ran it right alongside the basilica.

Surroundings 
Parco Ildefonso Schuster
Garbatella
Tiber
University of Rome III
Vasca Navale
Ospedale CTO Andrea Alesini

Streets 
 via delle Sette Chiese
 Lungotevere di San Paolo
 Ponte Marconi

Sports venues 
 former Cinodromo
 Stadio degli eucalipti

Gallery

External links 

http://www.atac.roma.it/index.asp?p=1&i=56&o=0&a=4&tpg=9&NUM=FU02A&st=90152

Rome Metro Line B stations
Railway stations opened in 1955
1955 establishments in Italy
Rome Q. X Ostiense
Railway stations in Italy opened in the 20th century